was the lead ship of the  of three light cruisers which served with the Imperial Japanese Navy during World War II. The ship was named after the noted Shinto Katori Shrine in Chiba prefecture, Japan.

Background
Katori-class cruisers were originally ordered to serve as training ships in the 1937 and 1939 Supplementary Naval budget. With the Pacific War, they were used as administrative flagships for various fleets, such as submarine command and control, and to command escort squadrons. The ships were upgraded as the war progressed with additional anti-aircraft guns and depth charges.

Service career

Early career
Katori was completed at the Mitsubishi Yokohama shipyards on 20 April 1940 and was based at nearby Yokosuka.

On 28 July 1940, Katori and her sister ship, participated in the last pre-war midshipman cruise, visiting Etajima, Mutsu, Dairen, Port Arthur, and Shanghai.

Early stages of the Pacific War
On 11 November 1941 Vice Admiral Mitsumi Shimizu, CINC, Sixth Fleet (Submarines) convened a briefing of his commanders aboard the Sixth Fleet's flagship, Katori on the planned attack on Pearl Harbor. Katori departed for Truk on 24 November 1941. At the time of the Pearl Harbor attack, Katori was at Kwajalein in the Marshall Islands.

On 10 December 1941, the submarine  reported sighting the aircraft carrier  and two cruisers heading northeast, and Vice Admiral Shimizu ordered his submarines to pursue and sink the carrier, but it escaped.

Katori returned to Truk by the end of 1941, and on 3 January 1942 Vice Admiral Shimizu held a briefing to discuss the details of the invasion plans for "Operation R" (the invasions of Rabaul and Kavieng), which took place from 23 to 24 January 1942.

On 1 February 1942, Katori came under attack at Kwajalein by Douglas SBD Dauntlesses of VB-6 and VS-6 and Douglas TBD Devastators from the carrier . Vice Admiral Shimizu was wounded in the raid, and Katori sustained enough damage to warrant a return to Yokosuka for repairs. The ship returned to Kwajalein in May, where on 24 May 1942 the new admiral, of the Sixth Fleet (Submarines) Vice Admiral Marquis Teruhisa Komatsu, ordered Captain Sasaki Hankyu detachment of midget submarines to stage the attack on Sydney Harbour.

Katori returned briefly to Yokosuka in August 1942 for upgrading with two twin Type 96 25 mm AA guns, which were fitted in the forward part of the bridge. It then returned to Truk, where it continued to be based (with occasional returns to Yokosuka).

On 21 June 1943 Vice Admiral Takeo Takagi assumed command of the Sixth Fleet (Submarines), but after the fall of Kwajalein Katori was reassigned on 15 February 1944 to the General Escort Command.

Attack on Truk

In the American attack on Truk of 17–18 February 1944, the American Task Force 58 with nine aircraft carriers, supported by six battleships, ten cruisers and 28 destroyers, launched a massive attack on Truk. Akagi Maru was sunk, and Katori was hit by a torpedo which did minor damage. Although aircraft could have finished off Katori, Admiral Spruance wanted a surface engagement, so Admiral Mitscher waved off further air attacks on the damaged light cruiser. The screening destroyers fired six salvos of torpedoes at Katori (which was already listing slightly to port and on fire amidships), but all torpedoes missed. Katori responded with a salvo of torpedoes which were equally ineffective.

CAG 17/A16-3 reported Iowa hit Katori with her second salvo. The damage on the port side was much worse. A large group of survivors were seen in the water after she sank, but the Americans did not recover any of them.. 

Katori was officially stricken from the Navy list on 31 March 1944.

References

Notes

Books

External links
CombinedFleet.com: Katori class

Katori-class cruisers
Ships built by Mitsubishi Heavy Industries
1939 ships
Cruisers of the Imperial Japanese Navy
World War II cruisers of Japan
World War II shipwrecks in the Pacific Ocean
Ships lost with all hands
Maritime incidents in February 1944
Shipwrecks of the Caroline Islands